Tony Mackintosh (born 28 December 1931) is a former New Zealand cricket umpire. He stood in eight Test matches between 1964 and 1973. He umpired 32 first-class matches, most of them in Auckland or Hamilton, between 1958 and 1973.

See also
 List of Test cricket umpires

References

1931 births
Living people
Sportspeople from Auckland
New Zealand Test cricket umpires